In the Bible, the abyss is an unfathomably deep or boundless place. The term comes from the Greek word abyssos (Ancient Greek: ἄβῠσσος, ábussos, proper noun: Ἄβῠσσος, Ábussos), meaning bottomless, unfathomable, boundless. It is used as both an adjective and a noun. It appears in the Septuagint, the earliest Greek translation of the Hebrew Bible, and in the New Testament.

It translates the Hebrew words tehóm ( (noun), deep, void), tsuláh ( (noun), sea-deep, deep flood) and racháv (spacious place).

In the original sense of the Hebrew tehóm, the abyss was the primordial waters or chaos out of which the ordered world was created. The term could also refer literally to the depths of the sea, the deep source of a spring or the interior of the earth.

In a later extended sense in intertestamental Jewish literature, the abyss was the underworld, either the abode of the dead (Sheol) or eventually the realm of the rebellious spirits (Hell). In the latter sense, specifically, the abyss was often seen as a prison for demons. This usage was picked up in the New Testament. Jesus sent the Gadarene swine into the abyss and the beast from the sea (Revelation 13:1) will rise out of the abyss. The locusts—human-animal hybrids—ascend out of the abyss to torment those who do not have the seal of God on their foreheads (Revelation 9:1–11). Paul uses the term in  when quoting , referring to the abode of the dead (cf. also ).

In , "deep calls to deep" (referring to the waters), or in Latin abyssus abyssum invocat, developing the theme of the longing of the soul for God. Cassiodorus relates this passage to the mutual witness of the two Testaments, the Old Testament foretelling the New, and the New Testament fulfilling the Old.

In , Abaddon is called "the angel of the abyss".

On the Origin of the World, a text used in Gnosticism, states that during the end of the world, the archons will be cast into the abyss by Sophia for their injustice. There they will fight each other until only the chief archon remains and turns against himself.

See also
 Abyss (Thelema)
 Abzu
 Cognitive closure (philosophy)

References

Afterlife places
Book of Revelation
Religious cosmologies
Religious terminology
Septuagint words and phrases